Bourdeto is a fish dish from Corfu. It comes from the Venetian word brodetto which means broth. It is fish cooked with onion, and red sweet and hot spicy pepper. The best fish for bourdeto is scorpion fish. One can also find the same dish containing fillet of a bigger kind of fish. In Patras and western Greece, the dish is also called Bourgeto/Bourjeto. In Zakynthos meat is used, instead of fish.

The traditional recipe is a fisherman's food, so they did it with the simple ingredients they had, such as lots of red pepper, both hot and sweet, and a good dose of lemon juice added in the end of cooking, they never used tomato or any tomato paste. See here

But later, some chefs wanted to make this very spicy dish more soft and attractive to tourists, therefore they added tomato and used less pepper, but this is not the traditional recipe.

The name's dish comes from a dish found on the eastern Adriatic coast, which is called Brudet.

References 

Cuisine of the Ionian Islands
Fish dishes
Culture of Corfu
Greek stews